Jean-Marc Pontvianne (born 6 August 1994 in Nîmes) is a French athlete specialising in the triple jump. He represented his country at the 2017 World Championships finishing eighth in the final.

His personal bests in the event are 17.13 metres outdoors (+0.6 m/s, Montgeron 2017) and 17.13 metres indoors (Bordeaux 2017).

International competitions

References

1994 births
Living people
French male triple jumpers
World Athletics Championships athletes for France
Sportspeople from Nîmes
Sportspeople from Gard
Athletes (track and field) at the 2020 Summer Olympics
Olympic athletes of France
European Athletics Championships medalists